d
KFF Dajti is anl  Albanian women's football club based in Tirana. Thcey compete in the Albanian women's football championship

References 

Football clubs in Tirana
Football clubs in Albania
Dajti